Torment may refer to:
 The feeling of pain or suffering
 Causing to suffer, torture

Films
 Torment (1924 film), a silent crime-drama
 Torment (1944 film) (Hets), a Swedish film
 Torment (1950 British film), a British thriller film
 Torment (1950 Italian film), an Italian drama film
 Torment (1986 film), an American horror film
 Torment (1994 film), or Hell, French drama film
 Torment (2013 film), a Canadian horror film

Novels
 Torment (1951), title of the republished novel Better Angel (1933)
 Torment (novel) (2010), by Lauren Kate
 Torment, a 1999 novel set in the Planescape realm of Dungeons & Dragons

Albums
 Torment (Six Feet Under album), 2017
 Torment (Zoogz Rift album), 1989
 The Torment, a 1990 album by Seventh Angel

Other
 Planescape: Torment, a 1999 computer role-playing game
 Torment: Tides of Numenera, a 2017 computer role-playing video game
 Mount Torment, in the U.S. state of Washington
 Torment (comics), storyline for Peter Parker: Spider-Man
 Torment (Magic: The Gathering) (2002), set of cards in the card game Magic: The Gathering